Walter Miceli of Brazil holds the world record for the longest working career as a stadium announcer. He has been the stadium announcer at the Estádio São Januário, Rio de Janeiro, Brazil, home of the Club de Regatas Vasco da Gama since 12 February 1947.

References

Year of birth missing (living people)
Living people
Place of birth missing (living people)
Public address announcers
20th-century Brazilian people